The 2020 United States Senate election in South Dakota was held on November 3, 2020, to elect a member of the United States Senate to represent the State of South Dakota, concurrently with the 2020 U.S. presidential election, as well as other elections to the United States Senate, elections to the United States House of Representatives and various state and local elections. Incumbent Republican Senator Mike Rounds was reelected to a second term in office, overperforming Donald Trump in the concurrent presidential election by 4.93 points.

Republican primary

Candidates

Nominee
Mike Rounds, incumbent U.S. Senator

Eliminated in primary
Scyller Borglum, state representative

Results

Democratic primary

Candidates

Nominee 
Daniel Ahlers, former state representative and former state senator

Did not qualify
Clara Hart, board member of the Sioux Falls Arts Council

Declined
Erin Healy, state representative
Brendan Johnson, former United States Attorney for the District of South Dakota
Billie Sutton, former minority leader of the South Dakota Senate and nominee for Governor of South Dakota in 2018
Susan Wismer, state senator and Democratic nominee for Governor of South Dakota in 2014

Independents

Candidates

Withdrew
Clayton Walker, independent candidate in the 2014 United States Senate election in South Dakota and Democratic candidate in the 2010 South Dakota House of Representatives elections

General election

Predictions

Polling

Results 

Counties that flipped from Democratic to Republican
 Clay (largest municipality: Vermillion)
 Day (largest municipality: Webster)
 Marshall (largest municipality: Britton)
 Mellette (largest municipality: White River)
 Roberts (largest municipality: Sisseton)

Notes

References

External links
 
 
  (State affiliate of the U.S. League of Women Voters)
 

Official campaign websites
 Daniel Ahlers (D) for Senate
 Mike Rounds (R) for Senate
 Clayton Walker (I) for Senate 

2020
South Dakota
United States Senate